Jacob Rathe (born March 13, 1991) is an American professional road racing cyclist, who last rode for American amateur team Ottolock. Rathe was born, raised, and resides in Portland, Oregon, United States.

Major results
Sources:

2009
 6th Overall Regio-Tour
1st Stage 1
2011
 1st Stage 4 Rutas de América
 1st Stage 9 Volta a Portugal
 2nd Road race, National Under-23 Road Championships
 3rd Paris–Roubaix Espoirs
2012
 1st Stage 2 (TTT) Tour of Qatar
 1st Stage 2 (TTT) Tour of Utah
2014
 9th Philadelphia International Championship
2017
 1st  Overall Tour of Xingtai
 1st  Mountains classification Tour of Utah
2018
 3rd Road race, National Road Championships

References

External links

Cycling Base: Jacob Rathe
Cycling Quotient: Jacob Rathe
Jelly Belly: Jacob Rathe

1991 births
Living people
American male cyclists
Sportspeople from Portland, Oregon